The cornetfishes or flutemouths are a small family, the Fistulariidae, of extremely elongated fishes in the order Syngnathiformes. The family consists of a single genus, Fistularia, with four species, found worldwide in tropical and subtropical marine environments.

The lateral line is well-developed and extends onto the caudal filament.

They generally live in coastal waters or on coral reefs, where they feed on small fishes, crustaceans, and other invertebrates.

Cornetfish are of minor interest for fishing, and can be found in local markets within their range.

Species
Currently, four recognized species are placed in this genus:
 Fistularia commersonii Rüppell, 1838 (blue-spotted or smooth cornetfish)
 Fistularia corneta C. H. Gilbert & Starks, 1904 (Pacific cornetfish)
 Fistularia petimba Lacépède, 1803 (red cornetfish)
 Fistularia tabacaria Linnaeus, 1758 (cornetfish or blue-spotted cornetfish)

References

External links 

Cornetfish video from Makena Landing, Maui Hawaii
YouTube video of a group of cornetfish taken in Shark's Bay, Egypt.
Genetic bottlenecks and successful biological invasions: the case of a recent Lessepsian migrant by Daniel Golani, Ernesto Azzurro, Maria Corsini-Foka, Manuela Falautano, Franco Andaloro, and Giacomo Bernardi

Fistulariidae
Extant Rupelian first appearances
Rupelian genus first appearances
Taxa named by Carl Linnaeus